Yann Soloy (born February 15, 1970 in Dieppe) is a retired French professional football player.
Soloy joined Scottish club Motherwell in December 2001. He scored his first and only goal for the club in a 2-1 loss to Livingston on 1 February 2002. He left Motherwell in April 2002 when they went into administration.

References

1970 births
Living people
French footballers
Ligue 2 players
FC Rouen players
Louhans-Cuiseaux FC players
Ligue 1 players
Le Havre AC players
French expatriate footballers
Expatriate footballers in Scotland
Scottish Premier League players
Motherwell F.C. players
FC Dieppe players
Sportspeople from Dieppe, Seine-Maritime
Association football midfielders
Footballers from Normandy